Sir William Stuart (31 October 1798 – 7 July 1874), was a British Tory politician.

Stuart was the son of the Most Reverend William Stuart, Archbishop of Armagh, fourth son of Prime Minister John Stuart, 3rd Earl of Bute. His mother was Sophia Margaret Juliana, daughter of Thomas Penn, of Stoke Poges, Buckinghamshire.

He was educated at St John's College, Cambridge.

Stuart was Member of Parliament for Armagh City from 1820 to 1826, and returned to Parliament as one of two representatives for Bedfordshire in 1830, a seat he held until 1831 and again from 1832 to 1835. Stuart was also a Deputy Lieutenant. He resided at Tempsford Hall, Bedfordshire, and Aldenham Abbey, Hertfordshire.

Stuart married firstly Henrietta Mariah Sarah, daughter of Admiral Sir Charles Pole . They had four children: 

William (7 Mar 1825 - 21 Dec 1893)  
 Mary Pole Stuart (1823 - 25 Jan 1852), who married as is his first wife, Jonathan Rashleigh. They had one son, and four daughters.
 Louisa Pole Stuart (d. 7 January 1858), who married, as his first wife, Rev. Oliver Matthew Ridley, grandson of Sir Matthew White Ridley, 2nd Baronet. They had three sons, and two daughters.
 Charles Pole Stuart (7 May 1826 - 26 Aug 1896), who married Anne Smyth, a second great granddaughter of the Ven. James Smyth, Archdeacon of Meath, and maternal granddaughter of the Rt. Rev. Bishop Nathaniel Alexander. They had three sons, and two daughters.

After her death in 1853 he married secondly Georgiana, daughter of General Frederick Nathaniel Walker, in 1854. They had no children. Stuart died in July 1874, aged 75.

References

www.thepeerage.com

1798 births
1874 deaths
Alumni of St John's College, Cambridge
Members of the Parliament of the United Kingdom for English constituencies
Members of the Parliament of the United Kingdom for County Armagh constituencies (1801–1922)
UK MPs 1820–1826
UK MPs 1830–1831
UK MPs 1832–1835
William